Narnala Fort or Narnala Qila Sarkar, also known as Shahnoor Fort, is a hill fortress in the Satpura Range of Vidarbh, Maharashtra, India, named after the Rajput Solanki Chalukya Ruler, Raja Narnal Singh, also known as Narnal Singh Swami. It was renamed as "Shahnoor" by Islamic rulers but again acquired, rebuilt and got its name "Narnala" by ruler Rao Rana Narnal Singh  Solanki, who migrated from Patan in Gujarat.

Rulers of Narnala
Briefly, the fort was first established in around 10th century A.D. by Gavli Kings and major fortifications were made by Narnal Singh Swami and some by Rao Rana Narnal Singh Solanki, like the Mahakali Gate. It was then taken over by other Islamic rulers. In the mid 15th century, it was occupied and rebuilt by the Mughals, becoming one of Berar Subah's thirteen sarkar. The fort was captured and fortified by Gond kings during the 16th century. Later, in the late 17th century, it was under Maratha Empire, controlled by Bhonsle of Nagpur Kingdom and their reliable regent and Sardar, earlier the ruler of Narnala, the Solanki Rajput Qiledar family of Rao Rana mentioned above.

The fort was occupied by several Indian dynasties at various times in history — 

1) Yadava dynasty

2) Rajgond of Devgarh-Nagpur (around 1400 CE)

3) A Somvanshi Kshatriya Chaulukya Rajput ruler Narnal Singh Swami

4) Bahmani Sultanate (1422–1436)

5) Farooqui dynasty (1437)

6) Fathullah Imad-ul-Mulk (1490)

7) Rao Rana Narnal Singh Solanki

8) Burhan Imad Shah, Imad Shahi Dynasty (1572)

9) Ahmadnagar Sultanate

10) Mughals (1597–98)

11) Maratha Empire (1701–1803), Raje Parsoji Bhosale's regent & descendant of the Rao Rana, later known as the Thakur Rajput Qiledar and their descendants, until 1803.

About Narnal Singh
Raja Narnal Singh or Narnal Singh Swami was a scion of Somvanshi Kshatriya Rajput Chalukya ruler, on whose name the fort is named. The fort was ruled by several rulers and qiledars after him thus making a lot of changes in the original Rajput style. After him, his descendant from the north & descendant of the ruling family of Rao Raja of Rajasthan came to this fort.

Kunwar Rao Narnal Singh, earned the title 'Rao Rana" becoming "Rana" of the Mahurgad & special rights of the Narnala fort, from  Imadshahi Dynasty ruler, son of Fathullah Imad-ul-Mulk, ruler of Berar Sultanate a Kannada Hindu, converted to Islam. Along with Mahurgarh, he was granted Bhawargarh from Rana of Bijagad. His younger brother got special rights of the Narnala fort, by Rajgond of Deogarh, later continued by son of Fathullah Imad-ul-Mulk.
After fall of Imad Shahi Dynasty, the Rana left Mahurgarh, because of disagreement with the later rulers, the Mughal, declining Mughal sovereignty thus lost the land and fort rights in a small battle to Mughal subhedars. After this the Rana joined Gonds of Devgarh, and his descendants fought against Mughals alongside Rani Durgawati, and were granted the title Thakur Rao of Narnala Sarkar, by the Gond ruler of Deogarh.
After the fall of Gonds, they were invited to join Marathas by Raja Bahadur Bhonsle of Nagpur who discovered this family to be of great valour and experienced in Narnala and surrounding forts. Thakurrao Harisingh Rana joined Bhonsle and served Maratha Empire, after knowing that the Bhonsles are descendants from Maharanas of Mewar.
 
Raghoji I Bhonsle, granted him title "Qiladar" of Narnala, Gawilgad & 8 other forts of Melghat, along with the Zamindar Patilki rights of 13 villages and Deshmukh of 21 villages in Malkapur pargana in the sarkar of Narnala. Even after being promoted to title Deshmukh, most of the family members carry the surname Patil or Sarpatil/Ranapatil, as this title has different respect amongst people of Maharashtra & due to respect of the trust shown by the Raghoji I Bhonsle, the Bhonsle Raja of Nagpur Kingdom.

A younger brother of the then Qiledar Thakurrao Rana (Sarpatil-Deshmukh), shifted his capital to from Malkapur to Nadgaon, dividing the family in two parts. There are 8 houses of the family for till now. The title holder Zamindars of which are as follows:

1) The elder branch of family is Malkapur branch of the Zamindars, carrying the titular rights of Deshmukh Vatandar Thakur Rao Rana, and held the office of Pargana officer of Taluka. But after the Khalsa of the watan (land) rights and the pargana officer's responsibilities of his grandfather, the elder descendant, Sriman Rana Thakur Onkarsinghji with the suggestion from HH Rana of Barwani and assistance from Rana of Pratapur, permanently shifted to Talode, Khandesh in the late 19th century.

2) The younger branch of family is Nadgaon branch of Zamindars, carried the title Vatandar, Rao and Patil. Later, the descendants earned various titles in pre-independence period like Rao Sahib, Diwan Bahadur, Rao Bahadur etc. Most honoured and notable person of this family is Smt. Pratibha Patil, the ex- President of India, also the daughter of the Rao Patil of Nadgaon.

Details
It consists of three small forts: Jafarabad fort on the east, Narnala in the centre and Teliagarh to the west. The lake within the centre of the complex is said to possess healing properties and according to legend contained the philosopher's stone, though no stone was found when the lake dried up in the drought and Indian famine of 1899-1900.

Occupied since at least the Khalji dynasty, the fort is well known for the Muslim saint Burhanuddin, "Bagh Sawar Wali", and it is said that many white tigers were seen with him at that time. Adil Beg or Atraf Beg carved many Arabic inscriptions into the fort and the Kadak Bijli cannon. It is also the birthplace of the Mughal Aurangzeb's great-grandson.

Location
The fort is located in the Akot Taluka of Akola district, Berar at coordinates of 21°14'38"N 77°01'40"E. The closest city is Akot, which is 18 km away. It is at the southernmost tip of the Satpura Hills at an elevation of 932 meters above sea level. Currently the fort falls within the Melghat Tiger Reserve.
Climate of Narnala fort is classified as Humid subtropical as per Köppen-Geiger climate classification with mild to cool winters (November to March), wet Monsoon season (June to October) and hot long summer (March to June). Temperature ranges from 0 °C to 23 °C in winter, 17 °C to 42 °C in summer and 15 °C to 27 °C in Monsoon.

History

The exact date of construction is not known. The first fortifications, according to local legend, were made by Narendrapal or Narnal Singh Swami, a descendant of the Somvanshi Kshatriya Pandavas and at the time Emperor of Hastinapur, a branch from Somvanshi Kshatriya Chalukya ruler of Ayodhya, whose descendant 
"Rao Rana Narnal Singh", later in early 16th century ruled Narnala for some years. It likely predates 1400 CE as Firishta -the Persian historian- records that 9th Badshah Shahab-ud-din Ahmad Shah I Wali (1422 CE to 1436 CE) during construction of the Gawilgarh fort, made repairs to Narnala fort when he camped at Achalpur (Elichpur) from 1425 to 1428. This would mean that the Narnala fort was constructed before Bahmani rule.

In 1437, when Nashir Khan the subhedar of Khandesh invaded Berar, the governor of the province (also called Khan-i-Jahan), remained loyal to his master, Ala-ud-din Ahmad Shah II (son of Ahmad Shah I Wali) and retreated to Narnala. He was besieged by disaffected nobles and Nashir Khan, but managed to break through the besieging force with help of Khalaf Hasan Basri who was sent by Ala-ud-din Ahmed Shah II. Nasir Khan was defeated.

In 1487, Narnala along with Gawilgarh came under the control of Fathullah Imad-ul-Mulk, the founder of Imad Shahi dynasty at Ellichpur (or Achalpur). He appointed some regents to rule different parts and forts of the empire, for e.g. Rao Rana  Narnal Singh Solanki as Governor of Narnala and sometimes Gawilgad.

In 1572, Burhan Imad Shah (also of the Imad Shahi dynasty) was confined in Narnala by his minister Tufal Khan. This gave Murtaza Nizam Shah of Ahmadnagar a pretext to lay siege to the fortress. He captured both king and minister, subsequently putting them to death. Thus the fort passed into the hands of the Ahmednagar kings. In 1597–98, the fort was captured by Akbar's officers, Saiyid Yusuf Khan Mashhad and Shaikh Abul Fazl, and renamed Shanur. from the officer who held it for the Sultan of Ahmadnagar. During Akbar's rule, Narnala was one of the Sarkars of Berar Subah (see Berar Subah).

Sardar Beg Mirza and Qader Beg Mirza, hereditary descendants of the Mughal dynasty in the 18th century, stayed near Argaon because Shah Beg Subedar of Berar held the fort.

Narnala was captured by Parsoji Bhosale in 1701 CE and he appointed the Raorana Family descendants the Thakurraos as the governor of Narnala  and the surrounding forts and Narnala remained with the Marathas till it was taken over by the British in 1803 CE.

The Islamic architecture
It is also said that the Shahnoor fort was modified/re-built by the Sultan Mahmud Ghaznavi because he was a follower of Bagh-Sawar Wali Burhanuddin, maintained after Imad Shahi dynasty and after this Akbar invaded Berar and the fort came under the Mughals. Mughals recreated the Narnala Fort with Mughal architecture and built a mosque at the fort. By his killedar, Shah Dulha Rehman Ghazi of Ellichpur (now Achalpur) was maternal cousin of Sultan Mehmood Ghaznavi and maternal grandson of Sultan Nasiruddin. He marched for battle against Rajah Eil. Through the route of Shahnoor Fort he stayed here threefold night and prayed.
     
Ahmad Shah Bahmani got the fort repaired in around 1425 when he constructed Gavilgad with a view to obstructing the invaders from the north frontier of his kingdom. Nearly all the present buildings seem to be of Islamic origin as the later Islamic rulers modified them. The fort passed on to Fathullah Imad-ul-Mulk when he became an independent ruler by 1490 as he was the Subhedar of Berar under the Bahmanis. Gavilgad was also passed on to him. 
Later, Burhan Imad Shah was imprisoned on this fort by one of his Amirs Tufalkhan who crowned himself. In the battle that was fought between Tufalkhan and Murtaza Nizam Shah in 1572 Tufalkhan was defeated and had to flee and took asylum with Muhammad Shah of Khandesh. On being threatened by Murtaza Nizam Shah of dire consequences if the asylum was continued, Muhammad Shah of Khandesh, refused to give refuge to Tufalkhan who was forced to return to Narnala fort and stay there. The fort was invested by the army of Murtaza. The fort surrendered and Tufalkhan and also Burhan Imad Shah were imprisoned along with 40 others. They were confined in the fort of Lohagad where they died while in captivity. Some historians say that all of them were poisoned under the orders of Murtaza Nizam Shah. After the battle that was fought between the armies of the Ahmadnagar kingdom and the Emperor Akbar on 26 January 1597 in which the armies of the Adilshahi Emperor who along with the Kutub Shah of Golconda was an ally of Nizamshah emerged successful. The fort can now ho ascended by a motorable road. About halfway up it crosses first one and then another piece of level ground, each thickly sprinkled with Islamic tombs.

The path passes two other strong gateways and one slighter one before entering the heart of the fort, and climbs meanwhile to the uppermost glials. Between the last two gateways are the domed tombs of Bagh Savar Wali and Gaz Badshah Wali, the former not only rode a tiger in his life but the old Gazetteer slates "even now a tiny white tiger may be seen at night going to and from his tomb." Passing the last gateway one comes almost at once before the Ambar Bangala, the kacheri of former days.
After his expedition across the Gangetic plains in 1017, of Al-Biruni to compose his Tarikh Al-Hind in order to understand the Indians and their beliefs.

Major features
The major features and architecture were done by Hindu rulers, mainly the Solanki Rajput Qiledars and the rulers of Gondwana, i.e., the Raj Gond, but modified by Islamic rulers into Islamic style by the time. It has 360 watchtowers, six large and twenty-one small gates. The large gates are called the Delhi Darwaza, the Sirpur Darwaza, the Akot Darwaza, and the Shahnoor Darwaza. The innermost of the three gate-ways is the Mahakali gate named by Qiledar family as Goddess Mahakali is their family deity. It is built of white sandstone and is highly ornate. It is decorated with conventional lotus flowers, a rich cornice, and later flourished with Arabic inscriptions, and flanked by projecting balconies with panels of stone lattice-work displaying considerable variety of design. It is considered an example of Sultanate style of architecture. An inscription records the fact that the gate was built in the reign of Shahab-ud-din Mahmud Shah (Bahmani) by Fathullah Imad-ul-Mulk in 1486. A short verse from the Quran is also inscribed. The fort still display " Ashtakamal" eight petals Lotus which was the symbol of Narnal Singh's Solanki dynasty Goddess Khimaj or Mahalaxmi. These lotuses are visible on the mosques and many other places. Hence it is evident that Islamic rulers made changes in Narnal Singh's original architectural construction and converted the place in Moghul/Islamic form. It was impossible for any ruler to rebuild the entire fort considering the geographical location of the fort.

It has an aqueduct and drains to catch rainwater. Along with 19 tanks, four of which are full throughout the year, this ensured a plentiful water supply to the fort residents.

Other buildings within the complex

 Mahakali Temple — The Mahakali Gate named after a temple of Mahakali in the beginning of fort which is in ruins now. It has been said that the temple had idols of deities which was later stolen.
 Rani Mahal — Rani Mahal or Queen's Palace is still standing. It served as a residential chamber for the queens, concubines and guest women.
 Peshwa Mahal — Peshwa came here and stayed along with the Bhosale Maharaja of Nagpur for an important meeting, the place is called Peshwa Mahal (also in ruins now).
 Baradari
 Saraf-Khana
 Arsenal of old guns called Nau-Gazi tope, meaning 9-yard gun, a reference to its length and not range
 Elephant stables of Narnal Singh and Bhonsle Maharaja.
 The ruins of a palace erected specially in honour of Raja Raghoji Bhonsle
 Another mosque on Teliagarh built by Bahmanis.
 The Jama Masjid, now in ruins, is said to have bore an Arabic inscription recording its construction in 1509 by Mahabat Khan, but this has disappeared.
 A small mosque attributed to Aurangzeb.

See also

List of forts in Maharashtra

References

Berar
Akola district
Forts in Vidarbha